Caroline Corinth (born July 20, 1994) is a Danish model.

Early life

Career
She posed on adverts for Victoria's Secret, Pilgrim,  and Pieces. She also walked runways for Matthew Williamson, Malene Birger, J.Crew, Ohne Titel and Charlotte Ronson.

She has been featured on the cover of Qvest, Eurowoman, Elle, DV Mode, Marie Claire and Cover, as well as editorials for S Moda for El Pais, Teen Vogue and Grazia.

References

External links

Living people
Danish female models
1994 births
People from Copenhagen